Syed Rahim Nabi (Bengali: সৈয়দ রহিম নবী; born 14 December 1985) is a retired professional Indian international footballer who primarily played as a midfielder though he could play as a striker and defender. Nabi last played for Peerless SC in the Calcutta Football League and won the tournament with the club.

Club career
A product of the Tata Football Academy, Nabi started his career playing as a striker, then moved to midfield and then played as wing back. In recent international friendlies he has been playing as a fullback. Nabi’s club career started with Mohammedan Sporting but later joined East Bengal in 2004.

After the 2012–13 season ended, Nabi signed with IMG-Reliance to join the Indian Super League. In 2013, he went to the United States on a trial with Major League Soccer side D.C. United but the signing did not materialize. On 30 October 2013, it was announced that Mohammedan S.C. has signed Nabi on loan.

In July 2015 Nabi was drafted to play for Atlético de Kolkata in the 2015 Indian Super League.

After two years gap, in 2017 Nabi again joined Mohammedan with a new challenge.

International career
Statistics accurate as of 21 November 2013.

International goals

Honours

India
 AFC Challenge Cup: 2008
 SAFF Championship: 2005, 2011; runner-up: 2013
 Nehru Cup: 2007, 2009, 2012

Individual
 AIFF Player of the year (1): 2012

References

External links
 
 Syed Nabi RSSSF−INT appearances
 IndianFootball.com profile

1985 births
People from Hooghly district
Footballers from West Bengal
Indian footballers
India international footballers
India youth international footballers
Association football wingers
Association football fullbacks
Association football utility players
Footballers at the 2006 Asian Games
2011 AFC Asian Cup players
Mohammedan SC (Kolkata) players
Bharat FC players
I-League players
Mumbai City FC players
ATK (football club) players
Indian Super League players
Asian Games competitors for India
Peerless SC players
Living people